Fortuna is a commuter railway station serving the Ferrocarril Suburbano, a suburban rail that connects the State of Mexico with Mexico City. The station is located in the municipality of Azcapotzalco in the northern part of Mexico City.

General information
Fortuna station is located in the Azcapotzalco municipality in Mexico City. It is the second station of the system going northbound from Buenavista and the last one to be located within Mexico City Proper.

The station is located a few meters away from Metro Ferrería/Arena Ciudad de México, servicing Mexico City Metro Line 6. Therefore, it is possible for users to connect here with the Metro network. Arena Ciudad de México, an indoor sports and entertainment venue, is also within walking distance from Fortuna station.

As with Mexico City Metro, each station of the Ferrocarril Suburbano has a pictogram. Fortuna's pictogram depicts four crosses. According to its designer, Alejandro Sarabia, they represent the several hospitals that are located in the area.

History
Fortuna station opened on 2 June 2008 as part of the first stretch of system 1 of the Ferrocarril Suburbano, going from Buenavista in Mexico City to the Lechería station in the State of Mexico.

Fortuna, alongside Buenavista, are the only two Ferrocarril Suburbano stations that connect with Mexico City Metro. The station connects with Ferrería/Arena Ciudad de México metro station through an underground tunnel.

Station layout

References

Fortuna
Railway stations opened in 2008
2008 establishments in Mexico